Statistics of Belgian First Division in the 1920–21 season.

Overview

It was contested by 12 teams, and Daring Club won the championship.
As the number of clubs was to be increased from 12 to 14, only one club was relegated to the Promotion Division, with three clubs promoted.

League standings

Results

References

Belgian Pro League seasons
Belgian
Belgian First Division